The Central Pacific Hurricane Center (CPHC) of the United States National Weather Service is the official body responsible for tracking and issuing tropical cyclone warnings, watches, advisories, discussions, and statements for the Central Pacific region: from the equator northward, 140°W–180°W, most significantly for Hawai‘i. It is the Regional Specialized Meteorological Center (RSMC) for tropical cyclones in this region, and in this capacity is known as RSMC Honolulu.

Based in Honolulu, Hawaii, the CPHC is co-located with the National Weather Service's Honolulu forecast office on the campus of the University of Hawaii at Mānoa. The Honolulu forecast office activates the CPHC when tropical cyclones form in, or move into, the Central Pacific region. The CPHC replaced the previous forecaster, the Joint Hurricane Warning Center, starting in the 1970 season.

Area of responsibility 

The CPHC's area of responsibility is the Central Pacific (CP) region, which is an administrative region, not a meteorological one. It is not a tropical cyclone basin (a distinct area where cyclones form), but is still often referred to as the Central Pacific basin or Central North Pacific basin. The western edge of the area of responsibility, 180°W, is formally the antimeridian, though this coincides with the International Date Line for tropical latitudes, and thus these are often conflated. Meteorologically, this region covers the western part of the Eastern Pacific basin and the eastern part of the Western Pacific basin, though administratively the National Hurricane Center is responsible for the Eastern Pacific basin east of 140°W, and thus the Eastern Pacific region (EP) typically refers to region east of 140°W, not the whole meteorological basin. The region east of 140°W was formerly the responsibility of the Eastern Pacific Hurricane Center; like the CPHC, it took responsibility in 1970, but it is now folded into the NHC.

In this area, the hurricane season lasts from June 1 through November 30. Practically, storms may form in the Eastern Pacific region (east or west of 140°W) and move west, possibly affecting Hawaii, or in the Western Pacific basin and move west, possibly affecting Asia. Smaller islands may also be affected, though this region is otherwise very sparsely populated.

Hurricane naming system

The Central Pacific Hurricane Center uses traditional Hawaiian names for hurricanes that form within its regional sphere of jurisdiction.  It has formed four lists of names to choose from.  As soon as all the names are exhausted from the first list, it moves on to the second, then third, then fourth, then back to the first and so on. Unlike the name list in the Atlantic and Eastern Pacific, the names do not start at "A" every year. Four names have been retired, Iwa of 1982, Iniki of 1992, Paka of 1997 and Ioke of 2006. They were replaced by Io (which was later changed to Iona), Iolana, Pama and Iopa respectively. The next name to be used from the list is 'Hone'.

Forecasting system
Since the 1990s, the CPHC has used the Automated Tropical Cyclone Forecasting System to create forecasts, advisories, and their associated graphics.

See also

 Joint Typhoon Warning Center (JTWC)

External links
 (merged with the NHC's since 2019)

National Weather Service
Tropical cyclone meteorology
Central
1970 establishments in Hawaii
Regional Specialized Meteorological Centres
Organizations based in Honolulu
Organizations established in 1970